Bidun (also Romanized as Bīdūn; also known as Dīdūn) is a village in Kachu Rural District, in the Central District of Ardestan County, Isfahan Province, Iran. At the 2006 census, its population was 11, in 4 families.

References 

Populated places in Ardestan County